Ayr TMD is a railway traction maintenance depot in Ayr, Scotland. The depot is located to the south of Newton-on-Ayr railway station. The depot code is AY.

History
In 1987 the depot had an allocation of Class 08 shunters and DMU Classes 101, 105 and 107. The depot also had two snowploughs. Other classes usually stabled at the depot included Classes 20, 26, 27, 37 and 47.

Allocation 
As of 2018, the depot has no allocation, although ScotRail Class 156 Sprinters, Class 314 EMUs and Class 380 Desiros are stabled.

References

Sources

Railway depots in Scotland
Buildings and structures in Ayr